Vriesea atropurpurea is a plant species in the genus Vriesea. This species is native to Brazil.

References

atropurpurea
Flora of Brazil